This article describes the qualification for the 2020 Women's U19 Volleyball European Championship.

The qualifying stage for the final tournament was cancelled due to the COVID-19 pandemic by the CEV on 15 June 2020. The tournament itself will be held with participants determined from European Ranking after the respective National Federations confirm their participation in the event.

Pools composition
The second round organisers were drawn and then the pools were set accordingly, following the Serpentine system according to their European Ranking for national teams as of June 2019. Rankings are shown in brackets.

First round

Second round

First round

Pool 1

|}

|}

Second round

Pool A

|}

|}

Pool B

|}

|}

Pool C

|}

|}

Pool D

|}

|}

Pool E

|}

|}

Pool F

|}

|}

Pool G

|}

|}

References

External links
Official website

Women's Junior European Volleyball Championship
Europe
Women's U19 volleyball